"Touché" is a song by American rock band Godsmack. It was released as the second and last single from their acoustic EP The Other Side. The song features a mellow sound and harmonics. It also features singer John Kosco and guitarist Lee Richards of the band Dropbox (Richards himself was the original lead guitarist of Godsmack). The song was used as a secondary theme song for World Wrestling Entertainment's WrestleMania XX.

Chart positions 

Godsmack songs
2004 singles
2004 songs
Rock ballads
Republic Records singles
Songs written by Sully Erna